James Brewster established Brewster & Company, an American custom carriage and motor coachbuilder, in 1810; it operated for approximately 130 years. Brewster got its start in New Haven, Connecticut, and quickly gained a reputation for producing the best carriages in the country. In 1827, he set his shop at 52 Broad Street in New York City.

The earliest known car bodywork by Brewster was on an electric vehicle in 1896, followed by a Delaunay-Belleville chassis with a gasoline engine in 1905. They eventually constructed bodywork on a variety of chassis, winning a special partnership with Rolls-Royce America Inc. in Springfield.

They built a series of elegant and pricey cars at their Long Island City facility between 1915 and 1925. In 1929, the Great Depression started, and sales of high-end vehicles decreased. In 1934–35,

Ownership
This company changed hands multiple times during the course of its existence, but they were typically connected to the founder's family. This company changed hands multiple times during the course of its existence, but they were typically connected to the founder's family.

Carriages
When he was 16 years old in 1804, carriage builder Colonel Charles Chapman hired James Brewster as an apprentice. James Brewster was born in Preston, Connecticut, on August 6, 1788, and died in New Haven, Connecticut, on November 22, 1866. He was a seventh generation descendant of Elder William Brewster of the Mayflower colony. Though he attained the rank of Lieutenant in the Northampton militia and gave military life a thought, he ultimately concluded that "coachmaker with a competency" sounded better than "General Brewster." When Brewster finished his apprenticeship and left for New York in 1809, he had $30.

Brewster entered a carriage factory as he was wandering around New Haven, Connecticut. Under John Cook, who ran a shop that made carriages, he was made a journeyman. He had finished working for Cook by 1810 (having saved $250), gotten hitched, and had two children.
His coaches were of the highest caliber. After a while, he purchased Cook's carriage store, his previous employment, to satisfy demand.

Brewster constructed a showroom and storage on Broad St. in New York City as his carriages gained popularity in bigger cities. Brewster gave his finest employees the greatest weekly cash wages in order to maintain their loyalty. Other small businesses, however, paid infrequently and not usually in cash.

Brewster eventually retired, leaving his older son James Benjamin (born 1817) to operate the competing firm of J.B. Brewster & Co. and his younger son Henry (born 1824) to run the New York branch of the company, which became Brewster & Co. William, Henry's 17-year-old son, joined his company in 1883. Having traveled around Europe to observe and

Automobile bodies 

In 1905, Brewster became importers for Delaunay-Belleville, one of many desirable French brands of the time. This was their first venture into automobile body building, beginning their history of providing coachwork for prestigious autos. In 1914, most Brewster coachwork sales were on Delaunay-Bellevilles and other French makes. In 1914 Brewster was carefully selected to be sales agents for Rolls-Royce Limited and they became the main body suppliers for Rolls-Royce in the US.

By 1925, Brewster's car had few sales, trading with Europe had resumed, and Rolls-Royce America Inc was expanding and gaining bargaining power against Brewster. Executives from Rolls-Royce of America and Brewster met and decided on the purchase of Brewster & Co. and their debt. Brewster had chassis fitted with temporary seats and protection and driven from Rolls-Royce's Massachusetts plant to the Brewster Building in Long Island City, New York for bodies. The Rolls-Royce showrooms offered 28 standardized body styles so as to deliver cars to customers quicker and for a lower price. Customers could purchase models directly from the showroom as well. Brewster gave English city names to the coachwork choices manufactured in America, to include the Derby Touring Sedan, the York Roadster, the Huntington Limousine, the Avon Sedan, Newmarket Convertible Sedan, and the French city of Trouville Town Car.

After Rolls-Royce America Inc. folded, from 1931 to 1934 Rolls-Royce Phantom II chassis were shipped directly from Britain to Brewster's large facility in Long Island City.

cars made by Brewster 

Most bodywork were ordered to fit the imported chassis of the customers. Supplies were in danger once Europe entered the war in the summer of 1914. Following the 1915 shipwreck of the British liner Lusitania, Brewster started producing its own automobiles, a practice it kept up until 1925. They cost as much as "a Packard Twin Six limousine plus a fleet of five Model T Ford roadsters," while being smaller than their typical chassis for traversing Manhattan's streets. Brewster's personal cars had oval radiators and gleaming patent leather fenders, making them easy to identify. They were frequently equipped with Brewster's distinctive two-piece folding windscreen and were propelled by four-cylinder Knight engines with sleeve valves.

On a Ford V8 chassis, the 1934 Brewster Town Car was mounted.

When the Great Depression first began,

Ford Brewster's initiative was originally profitable, but soon Brewster started to lose money, and the company's bondholders and directors asked that it be shut down. Dallas E. Winslow bought the company that was the subject of bankruptcy proceedings in July 1935.

Liquidation 
The last of Brewster's possessions were auctioned off in public on August 18, 1937. Under the leadership of previous sales director John Inskip, the Rolls-Royce dealership and body shop operated on the same location as before. During World War II, the Brewster Aeronautical Corporation remained in business.

Fame 

At the Exposition Universelle (1878) in Paris, Brewster & Co. displayed the following carriage configurations: a double-suspension Victoria, a Whitechapel Wagon, a double-suspension Brougham, a Lady's Brougham, a Cabriolet, a Landau, a Racing Sulky, a Road Wagon, a Park Drag, an American Trotting Phaeton, and a Lady's Ph

Brewster received the top award, the Gold Award. Only his American company received such recognition at the Exposition. The French President even gave Henry a personal Legion of Honor award, and his staff also earned recognition.

Brewster won a lot more awards at the Chicago World's Fair in 1893. (aka Columbian Exposition, marking the 400th anniversary of Columbus sailing to the New World.)

"The best is you! You are a Ritz hot toddy. The best is you! A Brewster is your body." When asked if Brewster was the Tiffany of carriage manufacturers, Edward King, the manager of the National Horse Show in New York, replied, "In my judgment, Tiffany was the Brewster of jewelers." Tiffany was, in fact, a younger company.

In 1956, Colonel Paul Downing penned the following for American Heritage Magazine: "It is unlikely, though, that America truly cemented its position in the world of genuinely stylish carriages prior to the company of Brewster & Company of Broome Street taking the initiative. The adage that a new design lacked value unless Brewster proved it became common knowledge in the industry."

Queens' Brewster & Co. building
Brewster maintained track of each customer's family crest and color. The Vanderbilts' was a shade of maroon, the Astors' was a shade of blue, J. P. Morgan's was a shade of dark green. New clients occasionally found it challenging to select a body color because of these exclusive choices.
Brewster created a top-secret oil-based finish that required far less upkeep than the varnishes of the day. Other businesses attempted to copy it but failed.
After conducting extensive investigation, Brewster created a windscreen with a four-pane design in response to drivers' complaints about blinding street lights at night. Even though it wasn't copyrighted, the "Brewster windshield" was widely imitated by body shops and production cars.
Brewster also produces the hulls for speedboats.
Children's pony carts and buses that can accommodate 20 or more passengers were also manufactured by Brewster.

Alumni
Brewster was the birthplace of many engineers and designers in the automotive industry. James Way initially worked at Brewster before becoming the designer and engineer of Pierce-cast-aluminum Arrow's bodies from 1904 to 1920. Edsel Ford, a Brewster native, convinced Henry Crecelius Sr., the head of Lincoln's coachbuilding section, to join the company. Brewster hired Raymond Dietrich as a draftsman beforee being fired for secret designing for other makes. Harry Lonschein founded Rollston after starting out at Brewster.

Notable Owners

Louis Comfort Tiffany - Brewster's second gasoline auto chassis, a Panhard et Levassor
John D. Rockefeller, Sr. - His Crane-Simplex had two Brewster bodies, for summer and winter.
John D. Rockefeller, Jr. 
Frank Winfield Woolworth 
Vincent Astor

Brewster V8 owners

Edsel Ford - Purchased the first Brewster-bodied Ford V8 available
Al Jolson 
Cole Porter
Lily Pons
Gertrude Lawrence
Fred Waring
Victor Moore

Edsel Ford
The 1935 Ford grill was used to create 15 of the vehicles using a Ford V8 chassis. The first delivered example was purchased by Edsel Ford. A 1934 Brewster Town Cabriolet DeVille (chassis number 18-802233; engine number 49493; Brewster build number 9002), a "one off" custom with a lengthened 127-inch wheelbase, was the third Ford Brewster and the only one without the standard Brewster front end. Edsel requested a 1934 Ford grill, therefore that is what was installed. It is also the sole model produced with a banjo steering wheel, normal Ford dash rather than the Brewster dash, and 16-inch wheels rather than the standard 17-inch wheels. It was stored by Edsel Ford at a Ford dealer in New York so that he and his family may use it while

The Brewster-bodied Ford chassis Town Car with heart-shaped grill is the only classic Ford designated by the Classic Car Club of America.

References

External links

 Vanderbilt family Park Drag 1892

Coachbuilders of the United States
Defunct motor vehicle manufacturers of the United States
Cars powered by Knight engines
Luxury motor vehicle manufacturers
American companies established in 1810
Manufacturing companies established in 1810
1810 establishments in New York (state)
Defunct manufacturing companies based in New York City